Gyrinus aeneiceps is a species of beetle from the Gyrinidae family. The scientific name of this species was first published in 1843 by Sturm.

References

Gyrinidae
Beetles described in 1843